Ignacio Segreste (born November 4, 1989, in Jala, Nayarit) is a professional Mexican footballer who currently plays for Zacatepec on loan from BUAP.

External links
Ascenso MX 

1989 births
Living people
Club Atlético Zacatepec players
Footballers from Nayarit
Mexican footballers
Association footballers not categorized by position